Çay Qurbançı (also, Chay Kurbanchy and Chaykurabanchi) is a village in the Gobustan Rayon of Azerbaijan.  The village forms part of the municipality of Qurbançı.

References 

Populated places in Gobustan District